In mathematics, the Lehmer mean of a tuple  of positive real numbers, named after Derrick Henry Lehmer, is defined as:

The weighted Lehmer mean with respect to a tuple  of positive weights is defined as:

The Lehmer mean is an alternative to power means
for interpolating between minimum and maximum via arithmetic mean and harmonic mean.

Properties 

thus this function is monotonic and the inequality

holds.

The derivative of the weighted Lehmer mean is:

Special cases

 is the harmonic mean.
 is the arithmetic mean.
 is the contraharmonic mean.
Sketch of a proof: Without loss of generality let  be the values which equal the maximum. Then

Applications

Signal processing
Like a power mean, a Lehmer mean serves a non-linear moving average which is shifted towards small signal values for small  and emphasizes big signal values for big . Given an efficient implementation of a moving arithmetic mean called  you can implement a moving Lehmer mean according to the following Haskell code.

lehmerSmooth :: Floating a => ([a] -> [a]) -> a -> [a] -> [a]
lehmerSmooth smooth p xs =
    zipWith (/)
            (smooth (map (**p) xs))
            (smooth (map (**(p-1)) xs))

 For big  it can serve an envelope detector on a rectified signal.
 For small  it can serve an baseline detector on a mass spectrum.

Gonzalez and Woods call this a "contraharmonic mean filter" described for varying values of p (however, as above, the contraharmonic mean can refer to the specific case ). Their convention is to substitute p with the order of the filter Q:

Q=0 is the arithmetic mean. Positive Q can reduce pepper noise and negative Q can reduce salt noise.

See also
Mean
Power mean

Notes

External links
Lehmer Mean at MathWorld

Means
Articles with example Haskell code